NGC 1683 is a spiral galaxy in the constellation Orion. The object was discovered in 1850 by the Irish astronomer William Parsons.

See also 
 List of NGC objects

References 

Spiral galaxies
1683
016209
Orion (constellation)